The Faxi (or Vatnsleysufoss ) waterfall is located on the Golden Circle, a popular tourist trail east of Reykjavik. The waterfall is located on the Tungufljót river.

Faxi can be found around twelve kilometres from Geysir and Gullfoss, and eight kilometres from Skalholt, away from the main road on a gravel track which includes a picnic area and a small car park.

The waterfall is full of salmon and is a popular spot for fishing, and very close to the waterfall is a  restaurant called Vid Faxa.

Kayaking in the waterfall is forbidden.

See also 

Waterfalls of Iceland

Waterfalls of Iceland